William Best Evans (September 13, 1932 – November 22, 2020) was an American basketball player who competed in the 1956 Summer Olympics.  Born in Berea, Kentucky, Evans played collegiately at the University of Kentucky. He was part of the United States basketball team which won the gold medal in 1956.

Evans died on November 22, 2020.

References

External links
Olympic profile

1932 births
2020 deaths
American men's basketball players
Basketball players at the 1956 Summer Olympics
Basketball players at the 1959 Pan American Games
Basketball players from Kentucky
Guards (basketball)
Kentucky Wildcats men's basketball players
Medalists at the 1956 Summer Olympics
Olympic gold medalists for the United States in basketball
Pan American Games gold medalists for the United States
Pan American Games medalists in basketball
People from Berea, Kentucky
Phillips 66ers players
Rochester Royals draft picks
United States men's national basketball team players
Medalists at the 1959 Pan American Games